Lauren Elliott is an American video game designer, internet entrepreneur, publisher and inventor.  He is recognized as one of the pioneers in the edutainment video game industry.

Elliott's greatest success to date came as the original co-designer for the Carmen Sandiego game series which remains the best-selling edutainment game in history.

Biography
Lauren Elliott is the grandson of Hall Roosevelt, brother of Eleanor Roosevelt.

Education
After graduating from the Millbrook School for Boys, Elliott attended Cornell University, transferring three years later to the University of Colorado Boulder, where he received his degree in architecture.  Becoming interested in environmental design, he then studied briefly at the University of Pennsylvania under Ian McHarg, followed by two years of graduate work in ecology at the University of California at Davis.

Career in game design
In 1983, Elliott walked into Broderbund Software in San Rafael, California, with a sketchpad full of game designs and was hired on the provision that he could convince a programmer to take on one of his designs. Over the next 13-year period he authored and worked on more than 23 titles.  He now has over 30 million copies of his work in circulation and is a winner of over 50 awards in originality and lifetime sales categories.

While at Broderbund, Elliott and Gene Portwood were Will Wright's project managers on his first video game, Raid on Bungeling Bay, in 1984.

In 1996, Elliott left to form Elliott Portwood Productions with his partner Gene Portwood.  During the next four years, they produced titles for The Learning Company, Maxis Software, Virgin Software, and The Software Toolworks.

In 2002, Elliott formed Dream Zero, an internet gaming company, later acquired by The Big Network.
 
In 2005, Elliott published a book – With Love, Aunt Eleanor – written by his mother, who is the niece of Eleanor Roosevelt.

Elliott is currently the Executive Producer of Proxi.

Games designed by Elliott

Where in the World Is Carmen Sandiego?
Where in the U.S.A. Is Carmen Sandiego?
Where in Time Is Carmen Sandiego?
Where in Europe Is Carmen Sandiego?
Where in America's Past Is Carmen Sandiego?
Where in Space Is Carmen Sandiego?
Where in North Dakota Is Carmen Sandiego?
Widget Workshop
Marty in Where’s Morgan
Marty and the Trouble with Cheese
Reader Rabbit's Ready for Letters
Time Riders in American History
Mario is Missing
Mario's Time Machine
Science Toolkit Master Module
Science Toolkit Speed and Motion
Science Toolkit Body Module
Science Toolkit Earthquake Lab
Whistler's Brother
Captain Goodnight and the Islands of Fear
Galleons of Glory: The Secret Voyage of Magellan
VCR Companion
Shufflepuck Café

References

External links

Says Her

Carmen Sandiego
American game designers
Living people
American businesspeople
University of Colorado Boulder alumni
Cornell University alumni
University of California, Davis alumni
Roosevelt family
Year of birth missing (living people)